KCQN genes encode family members of the Kv7 potassium channel family. These include Kv7.1 (KCNQ1) - KvLQT1, Kv7.2 (KCNQ2), Kv7.3 (KCNQ3), Kv7.4 (KCNQ4), and Kv7.5 (KCNQ5). Four of these (KCNQ2-5) are expressed in the nervous system. They constitute a group of low-threshold voltage-gated K+ channels originally termed the ‘M-channel’ (see M-current). The M-channel name comes from the classically described mechanism wherein the activation of the muscarinic acetylcholine receptor deactivated this channel.

References 

Potassium channels
Ion channels